The Grand United Order of Odd Fellows, American Jurisdiction is a jurisdiction of the Grand United Order of Oddfellows in the United States, Jamaica, Canada, South America, and other locations. Since its founding in 1843, its membership has principally included African Americans, due to black people being discriminated against, as was the norm in fraternal orders in America during the 1700–1800s.

History 
In contradistinction to the Independent Order of Odd Fellows (IOOF), the Grand United Order of Odd Fellows in America traces its origin to the original Grand United Order of Oddfellows in England, which was established in 1798.  In 1810 a group split from the Order and became the Independent Order of Odd Fellows, Manchester Unity.  In 1819 a branch of Oddfellowship was introduced into the United States by Thomas Wildey, and remained an organic party of the Manchester Unity until 1843, when it became a separate organization under the name Independent Order of Odd Fellows. By that time there were only four known lodges of Oddfellows in the United States owing allegiance to the Grand United Order; they were located near Pottsville, Pennsylvania. note: those four lodges were "self-inducted".

In 1842 members of the Philomathean Institute in New York city petitioned the Manchester Unity aligned American Oddfellows for a dispensation to form their institute into a lodge of Oddfellows. They were denied, because they were black. At this point Peter Ogden, a black sailor who had been initiated into a Grand United Order affiliated lodge in Liverpool, suggested that they try to receive recognition from them. This idea was approved and Ogden sailed to England and obtained recognition from the Grand United Order's governing body at Leeds to form the Philomathean Institute into Philomathean Lodge #644 on March 1, 1843. The four existing Grand United Order affiliated lodges refused to recognize Ogden as Deputy, admittedly because they did not wish to associated with black people. It is unknown if they ever joined the IOOF or disbanded, but they did not become a part of the Grand United Order of Odd Fellows in America.

By 1847 there were 22 lodges in Ogden's organization and in 1851 lodges from New York, Pennsylvania, Connecticut, Massachusetts, New Jersey, Delaware and Maryland met at a Moveable feast in New Haven.

Organization 

The Lodge has been the basic local unit of the Order since its founding. Councils of Past Grand Masters, also known as the Patriarchal Order of Past Grand Masters in America, were added in 1844 and are composed, as the name suggests, by Past Grand Masters of the Order. Patriarchies, composed of Past Grand Masters who have rendered particularly valuable service to the Order, were created during a reorganization in 1873, and are modeled on a similar British adjunct.

The number of lodges and other local units grew steadily during the 19th century. There were 32 in 1850 and 66 in 1860, though 17 of these were inactive. In 1863, at the twentieth anniversary of the Order, it was announced that there were 50 active lodges in the United States, Canada, and Bermuda and in 1867 there were 66 active lodges. During the 1870s the Order spread west and south, establishing lodges in Florida, Texas, Colorado and California. By the time of the Order's 1892 convention it had spread to Cuba. In 1897 there were 2,253 lodges and thirty six Grand Lodges.

By 1979, the structure had apparently changed somewhat, with the national organization called the Grand Lodge, six "regional groups" and local Lodges. National conventions were then held biennially and the headquarters were in Philadelphia The headquarters remain in Philadelphia (as of 2011).

Membership 
Membership has always been open to people of any race, though it has remained a predominantly African American Order. In 1979 there were 108,000 members. Their female auxiliary known as the Household of Ruth flourished during the golden age of fraternalism with nearly 100,000+ members.  Unlike the Independent Order, the members of the Household of Ruth maintain their independence from the GUOOF, although the men can attain the Ruth Degree.

See also 
 Odd Fellows
 Odd Fellows (disambiguation)
 Prince Hall Freemasonry
 Improved Benevolent and Protective Order of Elks of the World

References

Further reading 
 Charles H. Brooks The Official History and Manual of the Grand United Order of Odd Fellows in America Philadelphia;  Odd Fellows Journal Print 1902
 Michael Barga Grand United Order of Odd Fellows in America (1843–present) The Social Welfare History Project. (Also contains a list of its sources, which includes CH Brooks.)
 Odd Fellows Cemetery, East Knoxville, TN, wbir.com

External links 
 
 Stuart A. Rose Manuscript, Archives, and Rare Book Library

Organizations established in 1843
1843 establishments in the United States
Odd Fellowship